Peak Walk is a pedestrian suspension bridge linking two mountain peaks in the Swiss Alps. It is situated in the Diablerets massif of the Bernese Alps in the canton of Vaud, and connects the peak of Scex Rouge with another peak.  On the other peak is the viewpoint of the Glacier 3000 company. Scex Rouge is about  higher than Glacier 3000's viewpoint. Peak Walk is the world's first suspension bridge which connects two mountain peaks.

It has four pieces of key supporting steel cables with a 120 tonne loading capacity. Peak Walk is anchored by 20 pieces in the rock. It is expected that the current number of summertime visitors of around 50,000 will double as a result of the new bridge. Mountains that can be seen from the bridge include Mont Blanc (the Alps' highest point), the Matterhorn, Mönch, Jungfrau and Eiger, and the bridge has a partial glass floor that afford views down through it. The thin air at high altitudes and poor weather hampered construction work, and summer storms delayed the transportation of construction materials.

Note

References

External links
 
 
 Press Releases: Peak Walk
 Travel blogger review (in German)

Bridges in Switzerland
Tourist attractions in Switzerland
Suspension bridges